The Percha Diversion Dam is a structure built in 1918 on the Rio Grande in New Mexico, United States.  It diverts water from the Rio Grande into the Rincon Valley Main Canal, an irrigation canal.

Location

Percha Diversion Dam was completed on the Rio Grande in 1918, 21 miles south of Truth or Consequences, New Mexico.
It is two miles downstream from Caballo Dam, which was built in 1938. It is listed on the National Register of Historic Places.
The dam is accessible within the  Percha Dam State Park, which is considered one of the top five bird-watching sites in New Mexico.

Structure

Downstream canal

which carries water to irrigate lands in the Rincon Valley between Truth or Consequences and Las Cruces, New Mexico. 
The Rincon canal crosses over the Rio Grande in the Garfield Flume, and under the river in the Hatch and Rincon siphons.

See also

National Register of Historic Places listings in Sierra County, New Mexico

References

Dams in New Mexico
Buildings and structures in Sierra County, New Mexico
Dams completed in 1918
United States local public utility dams
Dams on the Rio Grande
1918 establishments in New Mexico